Keyumars or Kiomars was the name of the first king (shah) of the Pishdadian dynasty of Iran according to the Shahnameh.

The name appears in Avestan in the form of 𐬔𐬀𐬌𐬌𐬊 𐬨𐬆𐬭𐬆𐬙𐬀𐬥  Gaiio Mərətan, or in medieval Zoroastrian texts as Gayōmard or Gayōmart. In the Avesta he is the mythological first human being in the world. The corresponding name in Middle Persian is 𐭪𐭣𐭬𐭫𐭲 Kayōmart. In Ferdowsi's Shahnameh he appears as the first shah of the world. He is also called the pišdād, the first to practice justice, the lawgiver.

The Avestan form means "the living mortal", from gaya "life" and marətan   "mortal, human being"; cf. Persian mard "human".

Keyumars is also a popular first name in Persian speaking countries (Iran, Afghanistan and Tajikistan).

In Zoroastrian literature
According to the Zoroastrian creation myth, Gayōmart was the first human, or, according to the Avesta, he was the first person to worship Ahura Mazda. The Avestan forms Mashya and Mashyana appear as the male and female first humans; their names are versions of the word marətan "mortal".

In the eighth book of the Denkard, a reference is made to the Chethrdāt section of the Avesta, which is divided into 21 sections. Apparently this section dealt with how the world and mankind were created, including the creation of Gayōmart. References are also made to the Varshtmānsar section, which also included information about Gayōmart which Ahura Mazda had given to Zoroaster: "For 30 centuries I kept the world from corruption and decay, when the 30th century came to an end the Dīvs assaulted Gayōmart ... But I finally repelled them and plunged them into the darkness".

A concise story of Gayōmart according to Middle Persian texts is given by Zabihollah Safa:

In the Avesta, Gayōmart is named as the pure and righteous, and according to Zoroastrian tradition the genealogy of Zoroaster can be traced through 45 generations to him.

In the Shahnameh
Ferdowsi's great 11th century epic poem, the Shahnameh, begins with the story of Keyumars.  He was the first king to arise among humans, who at that time lived in mountain caves and wore the skins of leopards. Keyumars was also the first human to introduce royal practices and the preparation of food and was also the first practitioner of law and justice. He was so powerful that all humans, tame animals, and wild animals paid homage to him. God (Ahura Mazda) granted Keyumars the supernatural radiance called the farr (Avestan xvarənah), reserved for kings.  His son Siāmak was beloved of all except the Devil, Ahriman, who raised an army under the command of his own demonic son. When the angel Sorush (Avestan Sraoša) warned Keyumars, Siāmak led an army of his own. Siāmak accepted a challenge to single combat and died at the hands of the demon.

Keyumars mourned for a year, and then Sorush advised him to fight Ahriman once more. Siāmak's son Hushang (Avestan Haošyaŋha) was grown by this time and led the army that defeated Ahriman's son, who was bound and beheaded. Keyumars died after a thirty-year reign, leaving his throne to Hushang.

In the Meadows of Gold
10th century Muslim historian Ali Al-Masudi writes in his widely acclaimed historical book The Meadows of Gold and Mines of Gems that Keyumars was the son of Lud, son of Shem.

Sources
 Abolqasem Ferdowsi, Dick Davis trans. (2006), Shahnameh: The Persian Book of Kings , modern English translation (abridged), current standard
 Warner, Arthur and Edmond Warner, (translators) The Shahnama of Firdausi, 9 vols. (London: Keegan Paul, 1905-1925) (complete English verse translation)
 Shirzad Aghaee, Nam-e kasan va ja'i-ha dar Shahnama-ye Ferdousi (Personalities and Places in the Shahnama of Ferdousi, Nyköping, Sweden, 1993.
 Jalal Khāleghi Motlagh, Editor, The Shahnameh, to be published in 8 volumes (ca. 500 pages each), consisting of six volumes of text and two volumes of explanatory notes. See: Center for Iranian Studies, Columbia University.

References

External links
 A king's book of kings: the Shah-nameh of Shah Tahmasp, an exhibition catalog from The Metropolitan Museum of Art (fully available online as PDF), which contains material on Keyumars

Pishdadians
Legendary progenitors
Medieval legends
Zoroastrianism
Mythological first humans
Mythological kings
Pishdadian dynasty